Bullous lymphedema is a skin condition that usually occurs with poorly controlled edema related to heart failure and fluid overload, and compression results in healing.

See also 
 Lymphedema
 Skin lesion

References 

Vascular-related cutaneous conditions